The 1961 Paisley by-election was a parliamentary by-election held on 20 April 1961 for the British House of Commons constituency of Paisley in Scotland.

The election was caused by the appointment of the sitting Labour member Douglas Harold Johnston as a Senator of the College of Justice, a judicial post. The candidates were John Robertson for the Labour Party, John Bannerman for the Liberals and G R Rickman for the Conservatives. Robertson held the seat for Labour with a reduced majority of 1,658 from the Liberal candidate.

Result

References

By-elections to the Parliament of the United Kingdom in Scottish constituencies
Paisley by-election
Paisley by-election
1960s elections in Scotland
Paisley by-election
Politics of Renfrewshire